Michael John Owen Wakelam (15 July 1955 – 31 March 2020) was a British molecular biologist, director of the Babraham Institute in Cambridge, England.

Biography
Wakelam received a BSc in medical biochemistry (1977) and a PhD in biochemistry (1980) from the University of Birmingham. After post-doctoral training at the University of Konstanz (DE), he joined the Department of Biochemistry of Imperial College London in 1983. In 1985, he joined the Biochemistry department of the University of Glasgow as a Lecturer (1985), Senior Lecturer (1991) and Reader (1992). He became a Professor of molecular pharmacology at the University of Birmingham in 1993. In 2007, he became director of the Babraham Institute in Cambridge.

Wakelam died on 31 March 2020, of a suspected COVID-19 infection.

References

External links
 Michael Wakelam's group  at the Babraham Institute

Academics of the University of Cambridge
British molecular biologists
Alumni of the University of Birmingham
2020 deaths
1955 births
Academics of the University of Glasgow
Academics of the University of Birmingham
Deaths from the COVID-19 pandemic in the United Kingdom